Cape Fligely (Mys Fligeli), is located on the northern shores of Rudolf Island and Franz Josef Land in  the Russian Federation, and is the northernmost point of Russia, Europe, and Eurasia as a whole.

History

This cape was first visited on 12 April 1874 by the Austro-Hungarian North Pole expedition and named after Austrian cartographer Field Marshal August von Fligely (1811–1879).

See also
Extreme points of Europe
Extreme points of Russia
Extreme points of Eurasia

References

External links

Extreme points of Earth
Fligely